Lannoy Abbey, also called Briostel Abbey, was a Cistercian abbey in present-day Oise, France.

It was founded in 1147, from Beaubec Abbey.

Notes

Cistercian monasteries in France
1147 establishments in Europe
1140s establishments in France
Religious organizations established in the 1140s
Monasteries in Oise
Christian monasteries established in the 12th century